Elections to North Tyneside Council were held on 7 May 1998.  One third of the council was up for election and the Labour Party kept overall control of the council.

After the election, the composition of the council was:
Labour 43
Conservative 8
Liberal Democrat 7
Independent 2

Election result

Monkseaton

North Shields

Tynemouth

Seatonville

Cullercoats

St. Mary's

Whitley Bay

References

1998 English local elections
1998
20th century in Tyne and Wear